is a 1973 Japanese television series. It is the eleventh NHK taiga drama.

Plot
The series is set in the Sengoku period. Based on Ryōtarō Shiba`s novel of the same name.

The story chronicles the lives of Dosan Saito and Nobunaga Oda.

Production
Production Credits
Original story – Ryōtarō Shiba
Music – Hikaru Hayashi
Sword fight arranger - Kunishirō Hayashi

Cast
Starring role
Mikijirō Hira as Saitō Dōsan 
Hideki Takahashi as Oda Nobunaga

Saitō clan
Yoshiko Mita as Miyoshino
Keiko Matsuzaka as Nōhime
Gō Wakabayashi as Saitō Yoshitatsu
Gorō Ōishi as Saitō Tatsuoki

Oda clan
Minoru Chiaki as Oda Nobuhide
Yōko Minamikaze as Dota Gozen
Chieko Matsubara as Oichi
Jun Tazaki as Hirate Masahide
Joe Shishido as Shibata Katsuie
Yūki Meguro as Maeda Toshiie

Akechi clan
Masaomi Kondō as Akechi Mitsuhide
Ryoko Nakano as Mitsuhide's wife
Hiroko Hayashi as Tama, Mitsuhide's daughter
Akira Kume as Akechi Mitsuyasu
Seiichiro Kameishi as Saitō Toshimitsu

Hashiba clan
Shôhei Hino as Hashiba Hideyoshi
Kiwako Taichi as Nene
Goichi Yamada as Hachisuka Koroku
Masakane Yonekura as Takenaka Hanbei
Taizō Sayama as Sakichi

Kuroda clan
Tōru Emori as Kuroda Kanbei
Iroha as Shōjumaru
Sumio Takatsu as Mori Tahei
Hiroshi Iwashita as Kuriyama Zensuke

Tokugawa clan
Akira Terao as Tokugawa Ieyasu
Jō Kurashima as Honda Tadakatsu

Azai clan
Ryōtarō Sugi as Azai Nagamasa
Shoko Nakazawa as Chacha
Rieko Sugai as Hatsu

Toki clan
Ryūnosuke Kaneda as Toki Yorinari
Noboru Nakaya as Toki Yoritake, Yorinari's brother

Ashikaga shogunate
Muga Takewaki as Ashikaga Yoshiteru
Juzo Itami as Ashikaga Yoshiaki
Goro Ibuki as Hosokawa Fujitaka
Nobuyuki Ishida as Hosokawa Tadaoki

Others
Shigeru Tsuyuguchi as Iga Ninja: Tsuzura Juzo
Ryūtarō Ōtomo as Takeda Shingen
Ritsu Ishiyama as Takeda Katsuyori, Shingen's heir
Yoshiaki Hanayagi as Imagawa Yoshimoto
Ryūzō Hayashi as Suzuki Magoichi
Takahiko Tōno as Yamauchi Kazutoyo
Fumie Kashiyama as Chiyo, Kazutoyo's wife
Akira Nagoya as Gonzō Kani

References

External links
NHK,Kunitori Monogatari official cite

Taiga drama
1973 Japanese television series debuts
1973 Japanese television series endings
1970s drama television series
Cultural depictions of Oda Nobunaga
Cultural depictions of Toyotomi Hideyoshi
Cultural depictions of Tokugawa Ieyasu
Cultural depictions of Akechi Mitsuhide
Cultural depictions of Takeda Shingen
Jidaigeki television series
Television shows based on Japanese novels